Pipariya, Narayani is a village development committee in Rautahat District in the Narayani Zone of south-eastern Nepal. At the time of the 1991 Nepal census it had a population of 3786.It is also known as Hariharpur. A great leader of Nepal Harihar Prasad Yadav was born here.

References

Populated places in Rautahat District